The 10th Asian Cross Country Championships took place on March 1, 2009 in Manama, Bahrain. Team rankings were decided by a combination of each nation's top three athletes finishing positions.

Medalists

Medal table

References

External links
Results

Asian Cross Country Championships
Asian Cross Country
Asian Cross Country
Asian Cross Country
Sport in Manama
International athletics competitions hosted by Bahrain
21st century in Manama